Orisi may be:
 an alternative spelling of Orissi, an adjective form of "Orissa", a state in India
 a misspelling of Orici, a fictional character of the Stargate TV series
 a Fijian name
 Orisi Cavuilati, rugby player
 Orisi Rabukawaqa, army officer